Romulus is a fictional supervillain appearing in American comic books published by Marvel Comics. The character is featured in particular in those titles featuring Wolverine. He is the leader of the Lupines, a species resembling humans that he claims evolved from canines instead of primates through convergent evolution. A shadowy character whose origin and motives remain a mystery, he is shown to have orchestrated most major events in the life of Wolverine, manipulating and controlling him for most of his life.

Publication history
Created by writer Jeph Loeb and artist Simone Bianchi, the character first appeared obscured by shadow in Wolverine (vol. 3) #50 (March 2007), and made his first full appearance in Wolverine: Origins #39 (August 2009).

Fictional character biography
Romulus is first seen in several flashbacks that Wolverine experiences, later explained by Wild Child to have been induced by Romulus himself. He is shown leading the Lupines in prehistoric and barbaric times, being an emperor in Ancient Rome, as well as being the main force behind Weapon X.

In the present, Romulus restored Feral and Thornn's feline look after their depowerment on M-Day, augmented Wild Child's powers greatly, and seemed to have erased all humanity from Sabretooth causing the latter's death at the hands of Wolverine (later it was revealed Sabretooth was a clone). Romulus did all of this to reveal himself to Wolverine.

Romulus was also the one who took Daken from his dead mother's womb and raised him as a ruthless killer. Nick Fury revealed to Wolverine that Romulus has been manipulating people from his family's bloodline for centuries, and that he plans for Daken to become the next-generation Weapon X. This was achieved through Tinkerer who bonded the metal from the Muramasa blade to Daken's inner claws. Daken hinted he complied with the process because of his own agenda. Romulus told Daken to kill all the Weapon X experiments that gave them a healing factor with his Muramasa claws. He killed every one except Deadpool.

He appears to have ties with Russian authorities, arranging Omega Red's transfer to a regular Russian prison to set a trap for Wolverine. After Wolverine temporarily subdues Omega Red, he is captured by Wild Child, who reveals that Romulus made Logan and several villains battle each other, his agenda being vaguely described as him needing a successor. Moments after Wolverine uses the Muramasa blade to kill Omega Red, Romulus reveals himself in front of him, prepared for battle with four claws already extended (the three between the knuckles of his fingers and one extending from behind his thumb). Wolverine attacks Romulus but is easily overpowered since he is only using the sword at this point. Romulus slashes and attacks Wolverine from the shadows as he reveals his plans. Telling Wolverine that everything has led up to this moment. Romulus is what Wolverine will become. Pushing Wolverine to the breaking point, he drops the sword and pops his claws, much to Romulus' amusement. However, Wolverine fights back and gains the upper hand and slashes at Romulus' hand, shattering what turned out to be a clawed gauntlet. Seeing that Romulus' claws are fake, Wolverine taunts him saying, "You're not what I'm gonna become... I'm what you've always wanted to be". Hearing this, Romulus blindly attacks Wolverine with his remaining claws only to be slashed open by Wolverine. Seemingly beaten, Romulus tells Wolverine that although he is at the top of the food chain, by making Daken in his own image, he has set the stage for a confrontation between Wolverine and his son. Only the most ruthless will survive. Only the one most like Romulus. Wolverine defeats Romulus, but leaves him alive saying that he will return when he is ready to finish the job. As Wolverine turns his back, Romulus seizes the opportunity to knock Wolverine unconscious with his own sword. Romulus then leaves, but not before telling Wolverine to keep the Muramasa blade: he will need it. After his confrontation with Wolverine he coordinates a successful assassination in Tokyo from what seems to be his base of operations, a European-style castle. It is here that Romulus first begins to doubt his own understanding of Wolverine's actions.

Wolverine decides to confront Romulus one last time, using the help of various other heroes and his son Daken. In the end, as Daken is about to kill Romulus, Logan has Cloak teleport him into the Dark Force dimension. For a second Wolverine thinks he should behead Romulus, just like he did with Creed, but in the end he decides to leave him stranded in the Dark Force dimension.

However, thanks to Sabretooth's blackmailing life of Dagger, Romulus gets free from his prison. After a losing fight against Romulus, a mysterious woman with long red hair appears and tells Wolverine that the answers that he seeks are at the Weapon X facility. Following his fight with the Sabretooth clones, the mysterious woman appears to Wolverine again. She calls herself Remus and informs him that Romulus is her twin brother. She aids Wolverine in his struggle against Romulus and Sabretooth all while providing Wolverine with information about Romulus. She reveals to Wolverine that Romulus' claim about certain mutants evolving from canines rather than apes (referring to the Lupine) is untrue which Wolverine had long since guessed. She further reveals that the whole "Lupine Sapiens" story was all just an elaborate hoax by her brother intended to be a ruse for his real goal of creating a master race of natural mutants artificially enhanced by a new type of adamantium created using vibranium illegally mined from Wakanda, using Wolverine as a template. After tracking Romulus to his stronghold somewhere in Italy, Wolverine brutally attacks and incapacitates Sabretooth before confronting Romulus. Wolverine finds Romulus immersed within a tank very similar to the one Wolverine was held in during the days of the Weapon X Program. Wolverine breaks open the tank and savagely assaults Romulus with his claws. He gouges away much of the right side of Romulus' face, revealing that the bones beneath have been bonded with adamantium. As Romulus heals, Wolverine asks what the purpose is of becoming an imitation of him. Romulus declares that he is not as he once was, as he has "taken the best from both Wolverine and Sabretooth", implying that his animal-like powers were artificially copied from Sabretooth (as his twin sister has none of those traits and her only powers shown is a healing-factor).  He reveals that he now has four adamantium claws from both his hands in exactly the same configuration he used on the gauntlets he wore. As he launches into his attack, Romulus says to Wolverine that having Romulus erase his memory and bond the adamantium to his skeleton was actually his idea rather than something that he was forced to endure as he's believed for so long (however, this assertion remains ambiguous). Romulus and Wolverine resume their battle with Wolverine ultimately proving victorious, resulting in Romulus being remanded to the Raft.

Powers and abilities
Little is known about the full extent of Romulus's powers. As with Wolverine, Romulus' primary power is an accelerated healing factor that allows him to rapidly regenerate damaged or destroyed tissue with far greater speed and efficiency than normal humans. The full limits of this power are not known, but he has healed wounds that ripped away the flesh from the right side of his face, exposing the bone, within a matter of seconds. Romulus' healing factor also grants him virtual immunity to known diseases and renders him highly resistant to most forms of drugs. It also affords him greatly extended longevity by slowing his natural aging process to an extraordinary degree as he claims to be tens of thousands of years old. However, Romulus is known to mix exaggeration and half truths in order to perpetuate the mystique surrounding him, though Romulus is ancient. Since the appearance of Remus, she has confirmed that Romulus is at least several thousand years of age. While he does show signs of aging, such as his hair turning almost completely white where it was once black, Romulus still has the same physical vitality and overall appearance of his physical prime. Romulus' senses of sight, smell and hearing are also enhanced to unknown superhuman levels. While they constitute a separate power, their efficiency is still somewhat linked to his healing factor. Romulus also possesses some degree of superhuman strength, the limits of which aren not fully known, though it has been shown as sufficient to lift Wolverine by the arm over his head using one hand and hurl him across a room. Romulus' speed, agility, and reflexes are similarly enhanced. His healing factor grants him partial immunity to the fatigue toxins generated by his muscles during physical activity, so he has much greater stamina and endurance than an ordinary human. He can exert himself physically for at least several hours before the buildup of fatigue toxins in his blood begins to impair him. He also possesses a single, retractable claw at the tip of each finger as well as elongated canine teeth. Romulus' claws are extremely sharp and are capable of cutting most known conventional materials and flesh.

Romulus has also displayed some degree of telepathic capabilities during past confrontations with Wolverine. He has been able to enter Wolverine's mind and to manipulate his memories, even going so far as to be able to create false memories or to awaken memories that have been suppressed. However, his telepathic powers are nowhere near the level of Charles Xavier, as Xavier has used his powers to shield Wolverine's mind from Romulus' influence for years.

After his return from the Dark Dimension, Romulus underwent the process of bonding adamantium to his skeleton. As a result, his bones are now virtually indestructible. Romulus has also had four adamantium claws implanted into each arm that have the same configuration as the claws mounted onto his gloves. As with his skeleton, these claws are virtually unbreakable and can cut nearly any known substance. 

Romulus is consistently depicted as being of exceptional stature, surpassing even Sabretooth in size. The font used for his words is unique, having a more ancient appearance than those of other characters. Although he often appears naked, he has been shown to wear clothes on several occasions, possibly making use of the fact that only a few living people can recognize him. Romulus has been seen wearing armor over his right knee which has a faint reminder of the adamantium armor worn by Cyber.

His facial features are very similar to both Sabretooth and Wolverine. This is seen in his sideburns, canine fangs, pointy ears, and white eyes. His hair is almost solid white with the exception of his bangs, which are black. Romulus has been seen wearing his hair in a long pony tail in a way similar to Omega Red. Romulus also speaks with a unique accent. According to Wolverine, it sounds part Italian and part Japanese.

Skills
Romulus is extremely intelligent with detailed knowledge of genetics and other areas of science. Romulus also controls a vast criminal empire spread throughout the world and has contacts throughout the criminal underworld. Romulus is also a master manipulator that prefers to work behind the scenes. He is also a formidable hand-to-hand combatant with many thousands of years of experience and knowledge. He also has extensive knowledge of many foreign and ancient cultures as he has alleged to have participated in the rise and fall of many civilizations throughout his existence.

References

External links
 Romulus at Marvel Wiki

Comics characters introduced in 2007
Marvel Comics characters with superhuman strength
Marvel Comics characters with accelerated healing
Fictional characters with slowed ageing
Fictional crime bosses
Fictional life scientists
Marvel Comics characters who can move at superhuman speeds
Marvel Comics mutants
Marvel Comics supervillains
Marvel Comics telepaths
Characters created by Jeph Loeb
Wolverine (comics) characters
Cultural depictions of Romulus and Remus